Walter Anthony (February 13, 1872 in Stockton, CA – May 1, 1945 in Hollywood, CA) was a screenplay, titles and documentary film writer. Before Walter started writing in films he was a dramatic and musical critic for The San Francisco Call.

Selected filmography
 Foolish Wives (1922)
 Oliver Twist (1922)
 The Drivin' Fool (1923)
 A Boy of Flanders (1924)
 The Lightning Rider (1924)
 When a Man's a Man (1924)
 After Business Hours (1925)
 The Phantom of the Opera (1925)
 The Cat and the Canary (1927)
 The Last Performance (1927)
 Jazz Mad (1928)
The Michigan Kid (1928)
 The Man Who Laughs (1928)
 Love and the Devil (1929)
 All Quiet on the Western Front (1930)
 Courage (1930)
 General Crack (1930)
 Golden Dawn (1930)
 Paroled from the Big House (1938)

External links
 
 allmovie.com

1872 births
1945 deaths
American male screenwriters
20th-century American male writers
20th-century American screenwriters